

Denmark
Danish West Indies – Peter Carl Frederik von Scholten, Governor-General of the Danish West Indies (1827–1848)
Iceland – Lorentz Angel Krieger, Governor of Iceland (1829–1836)
North Greenland – Ludvig Fasting, Inspector of North Greenland (1828–1843)
South Greenland – Carl Peter Holbøll, Inspector of South Greenland (1828–1856)

France
French Guiana –
Jean-Guillaume Jubelin, Governor of French Guiana (1829–1836)
François Dominique Laurens de Choisy, Governor of French Guiana (1836–1837)
Guadeloupe – René Arnous des Saulsays, Governor of Guadeloupe (1831–1837)
Martinique –
Emmanuel Halgan, Governor of Martinique (1834–1836)
Ange René Armand, Governor of Martinique (1836–1838)

Netherlands
Dutch West Indies – Evert Ludolph baron van Heeckeren, Governor-General of the Dutch West Indies (1831–1838)
Surinam
Netherlands Antilles

Portugal
Angola –
 Military junta (1834–1836)
 Domingos Saldanha de Oliveira Daun, Governor of Angola (1836)
 Temporarily vacant (1836–1837)

Spain
Cuba – Miguel Tacón, Governor of Cuba (1834–1838)
Puerto Rico – Miguel de la Torre, Governor of Puerto Rico (1823–1837)

United Kingdom
Assiniboia – Alexander Christie, Governor of Assiniboia (1833–1839, 1844–1846)
Reincorporated into Rupert's Land 4 May 1836
The Bahamas – William MacBean George Colebrooke, Governor of the Bahamas (1835–1837)
Bermuda – Sir Stephen Remnant Chapman, Governor of Bermuda (1832–1839)
British Columbia – John McLoughlin, Governor of British Columbia (1825–1838, 1839–1845)
British Guiana – Sir James Carmichael Smyth, Governor of British Guiana (1833–1838)
British North America – The Earl Archibald Acheson, Governor General of British North America (1835–1837)
Lower Canada – The Earl Archibald Acheson, Lieutenant-Governor of Lower Canada (1835–1838)
New Brunswick – Sir Archibald Campbell, Lieutenant-Governor of New Brunswick (1831–1837)
Nova Scotia – Sir Colin Campbell, Governor of Nova Scotia (1834–1840)
Prince Edward Island –
George Wright, Governor of Prince Edward Island (1835–1836)
Sir John Harvey, Governor of Prince Edward Island (1836–1837)
Upper Canada –
Sir John Colborne, Lieutenant-Governor of Upper Canada, (1828–1836)
Sir Francis Bond Head, Lieutenant-Governor of Upper Canada, (1836–1838)
Jamaica (with Belize) –
Sir Howe Peter Browne, Governor of Jamaica (1834–1836)
Sir Lionel Smith, Governor of Jamaica (1836–1839)
Leeward Islands (Antigua, British Virgin Islands, Dominica, Montserrat, Saint Christopher-Nevis-Anguilla) – Evan John Murray MacGregor, Governor of the Leeward Islands (1832–1836)
 Malta Colony
George Cardew, Acting Governor of Malta (1835–1836)
Thomas Evans, Acting Governor of Malta (1836)
Henry Bouverie, Governor of Malta (1836–1843)
Colony of Newfoundland – Henry Prescott, Governor of Newfoundland and Labrador (1834–1841)
New South Wales – Major-General Richard Bourke, Governor of New South Wales (1831–1837)
Rupert's Land – Sir John Henry Pelly, Governor of the Hudson's Bay Company (1822–1852)
South Australia
 Captain John Hindmarsh, Governor of South Australia (1836–1838)
 note:  Colony was established 28 December 1836 by Captain Hindmarsh
Trinidad – Sir George Fitzgerald Hill, Governor of Trinidad (1833–1839)
Western Australia – Captain James Stirling, Governor of Western Australia (1828–1839)
Windward Islands (Barbados, Grenada, St. Lucia, St. Vincent, Tobago) –
Sir Lionel Smith, Governor of the Windward Islands (1833–1836)
Evan John Murray MacGregor, Governor of the Windward Islands (1836–1841)

Colonial governors
Colonial governors
1836